Erica capensis, the Cape heath, is a species of Erica that was naturally restricted to the city of Cape Town, South Africa.

capensis
Endemic flora of South Africa
Flora of the Cape Provinces
Natural history of Cape Town
Species endangered by urbanization